Mathurin is a surname. Notable people with the name include:

Bennedict Mathurin (born 2002), Canadian basketball player
Cletus Mathurin (born 1982), Saint Lucian cricketer 
Cowin Mathurin (born 1983), Saint Lucian footballer
Gail Mathurin (born 1960), Jamaican ambassador
Garey Mathurin (born 1983), Saint Lucian cricketer
Ruthny Mathurin (born 2001), Haitian footballer

See also
Mathurin (given name)